Choi Ja-hye (born July 26, 1981) is a South Korean actress. She is best known for starring in the television drama King of Baking, Kim Takgu (2010).

Filmography

Television series

Variety show

Music video

References

External links
 
 
 Choi Ja-hye Fan Cafe at Daum
 
 

1981 births
Living people
South Korean television actresses
Seoul Institute of the Arts alumni
Actresses from Seoul